Ethan A. Stroud (1788–1846) was the Indian Commissioner on the Texas frontier, circa 1842. Stroud established an Indian Trading post on the Brazos River.

External links

Bill for Two Commissioners December 19, 1842 From Texas Tides

1788 births
1846 deaths
American pioneers